The Squire of Dames is an American play by R. C. Carton. It is an adaptation of L'Ami des Femmes by Alexandre Dumas fils. It was featured on Broadway in 1896 and starred Maude Adams.

American plays
1896 plays
Broadway plays
Plays by R. C. Carton